José Martiniano Pereira de Alencar (October 16, 1794 – March 15, 1860) was a Brazilian politician, journalist and priest, father of famous Brazilian novelist José de Alencar and diplomat Leonel Martiniano de Alencar, the Baron of Alencar.

A member of the Pernambucan Revolt alongside his mother Bárbara Pereira de Alencar and brothers Tristão Gonçalves and Carlos José dos Santos, and a member of the Confederation of the Equator, he was senator of Ceará and later its governor, from 1834 to 1837, and again from 1840 to 1841.

External links

 Report of the governor of the province of Ceará opening the second session of the Legislative Assembly on August 1, 1836 
 Report of the governor of the province of Ceará opening the third session of the Legislative Assembly on August 1, 1837 

1794 births
1860 deaths
People from Crato, Ceará
Governors of Ceará
Presidents of the Chamber of Deputies (Brazil)
Brazilian journalists
Male journalists
Members of the Senate of the Empire of Brazil
19th-century Brazilian male artists
19th-century Brazilian politicians
20th-century Brazilian male writers
19th-century  Brazilian Roman Catholic priests